Tony Lorenzo Delk (born January 28, 1974) is an American former professional basketball player and college assistant coach. He last served as an assistant coach for the New Mexico State Aggies men's basketball team. During his playing days, he was team leader of the Kentucky Wildcats team that won the 1996 NCAA Championship Game. After college, he played for eight National Basketball Association (NBA) teams over 10 seasons.

High school
Delk attended Haywood Junior High School and Haywood High School in Brownsville, Tennessee. During his 1992 senior year of high school, Delk was named "Mr. Basketball" in the state of Tennessee (TSSAA Class 3A Mr.Basketball 1992) and also to the Parade and McDonald's All-American Teams.

College career

As a sophomore at Kentucky, Delk was voted All-SEC 2nd Team by the coaches and All-SEC 3rd Team by the Associated Press, while also making the All-SEC Tournament Team for his outstanding play. Delk was named to the All-SEC 1st and All-NCAA Regional teams during the 1994–95 season. In the 1995–96 season, Delk was named to the All-American and All-SEC first teams and was named NCAA basketball tournament Most Outstanding Player. He also received SEC Player of the Year honors during the season. Delk joined Omega Psi Phi Fraternity while at Kentucky.

College statistics

|-
| style="text-align:left;"|1992–93
| style="text-align:left;"|Kentucky
| 30 ||  || 9.6 || .452 || .353 || .727 || 1.9 || .7 || .6 || .1 || 4.5
|-
| style="text-align:left;"|1993–94
| style="text-align:left;"|Kentucky
| 34 || 34 || 28.1 || .455 || .374 || .639 || 4.5 || 1.7 || 1.9 || .6 || 16.6
|-
| style="text-align:left;"|1994–95
| style="text-align:left;"|Kentucky
| 33 || 32 || 29.1 || .478 || .391 || .674 || 3.3 || 2.0 || 1.6 || .3 || 16.7
|-
| style="text-align:left;"|1995–96
| style="text-align:left;"|Kentucky
| 36 ||  || 26.3 || .494 || .443 || .800 || 4.2 || 1.8 || 1.9 || .4 || 17.8
|- class="sortbottom"
| style="text-align:center;" colspan="2"|Career
| 133 || 66 || 23.7 || .474 || .397 || .709 || 3.5 || 1.6 || 1.5 || .3 || 14.2

Playing career

Tony Delk was picked 16th overall in the 1996 NBA draft by the Charlotte Hornets. He was traded by the Hornets along with Muggsy Bogues to the Golden State Warriors for B. J. Armstrong on November 7, 1997, where he played for two seasons before signing with the Sacramento Kings on August 16, 1999. He appeared in 46 games in 1999-00, subsequently joining the Phoenix Suns on August 1, 2000.

In a January 2, 2001, overtime game against the Kings, he scored a career-high 53 points on 20-for-27 field goal shooting. This was the only game of Delk's career in which he scored 30 or more points. Delk was eventually dealt with Rodney Rogers to the Celtics, for Joe Johnson, Milt Palacio, and Randy Brown.

On October 20, 2003, Delk was traded to the Dallas Mavericks, along with Antoine Walker for Chris Mills, Jiří Welsch, Raef LaFrentz, and a 2004 first-round pick. After a year with the Mavericks, Delk and Walker were again traded, in a deal for Jason Terry and Alan Henderson. Delk lasted one and a half seasons with the Hawks before being waived on February 25, 2006, signing with the Detroit Pistons on March 1, where he backed up point guard Chauncey Billups.

Delk finished his NBA career with averages of 9.1 PPG, 2.5 RPG and 1.9 APG as he, in August 2006, signed a contract with the Greek basketball team, Panathinaikos, in Athens. He won the Greek Cup, the Greek Championship and the European Championship with Panathinaikos, but was released in May 2007, citing compatibility issues. He announced his retirement from professional basketball in November 2007. In 2008, nonetheless, he played three games for the Gigantes de Carolina in the BSN, the professional basketball league of Puerto Rico. He retired, once again, and served as a technical assistant with the same team.

Coaching career
On April 16, 2009 it was announced that Delk would be returning to his alma mater along with his former college teammate Scott Padgett to serve on coach John Calipari's staff at the University of Kentucky.

In July 2011, the New Mexico State Aggies basketball team hired him as an assistant coach to Marvin Menzies.

In June 2013, Delk left the New Mexico State staff to pursue other opportunities closer to his family in Atlanta.

Broadcasting career
In October 2014, the SEC Network announced Delk had been hired as an in-studio analyst and announcer for the upcoming college basketball season.

Personal life
Tony Delk is the president of the Taylor Delk Sickle Cell Foundation. The foundation is named after his daughter, who has sickle cell disease.

Delk divorced from his former Spouse, Margie Delk, in 2007.

References

External links

 Tennessee Secondary School Athletic Association "Mr. Basketball" List
 Taylor Delk Sickle Cell Foundation

1974 births
Living people
African-American basketball players
All-American college men's basketball players
American expatriate basketball people in Greece
American men's basketball players
Atlanta Hawks players
Baloncesto Superior Nacional players
Basketball coaches from Tennessee
Basketball players from Tennessee
Boston Celtics players
Charlotte Hornets draft picks
Charlotte Hornets players
Dallas Mavericks players
Detroit Pistons players
Golden State Warriors players
Greek Basket League players
Kentucky Wildcats men's basketball coaches
Kentucky Wildcats men's basketball players
McDonald's High School All-Americans
New Mexico State Aggies men's basketball coaches
Panathinaikos B.C. players
Parade High School All-Americans (boys' basketball)
People from Brownsville, Tennessee
People from Covington, Tennessee
Phoenix Suns players
Sacramento Kings players
Shooting guards
21st-century African-American sportspeople
20th-century African-American sportspeople